Riverside was a music venue in Newcastle upon Tyne, England which operated from 1985 to 1999. It is the subject of a book, Riverside: Newcastle's Legendary Alternative Music Venue, by Hazel Plater and Carl Taylor, published by Tonto Books on 6 October 2011.

The Riverside name has been resurrected for a medium-sized music venue and nightlife spot in the city today, although it is not a direct continuation of the original venue.

Co-operative
It was set up as a left wing co-operative, Riverside Entertainments Ltd, using funding from Margaret Thatcher's government. Each member had a share and a vote on how the venue was run.

Significant appearances
Artists who played included Julian Cope, The Waterboys, Red Hot Chili Peppers, Elvis Costello, Billy Bragg, The Go-Betweens, The Primitives, Michelle Shocked, Harrington, Pop Will Eat Itself, Doctor and the Medics, The Smiths, The Fall, Bad Religion, Belly, The Cranberries, James, The Stone Roses, Happy Mondays, The Charlatans (UK band), Sonic Youth, Nirvana (Riverside was their first live show outside North America), Pearl Jam, Oasis (famously cut short due to a fracas whilst broadcast live on BBC Radio One), Super Furry Animals, Catatonia, Faithless and David Bowie (at 890 capacity, it was the smallest venue on his 1997 tour).

TV show
In 1991 Riverside had its own self-titled Tyne Tees Television "fly-on-the-wall" TV show when the genre was still new.

Club nights
The venue was also renowned for its club nights; Bliss, Woosh, The Bing Bong Rooms, Scarlet Weasel, The Palace, Viva and, most notably, its house night, Shindig. In an interview with The Crack magazine, Shindig promoters Scott Bradford and Lee Melrose said that the best days of Shindig were those the club night spent at Riverside, between 1994 and 1999.
There was also noted a regular goth night called The Midian that ran until the mid 90s, ran by the producers of local alternative magazine "Bats & Red Velvet".
It also hosted a one-off night for what became a regular goth night called "Snakebite & Black" which later moved to Rockshots.

Changes and sale
Riverside ceased to be a co-operative and became a limited company - Riverside Operations Ltd in 1994. The venue continued to trade until the building was sold in 1999.  Foundation nightclub then ran on the same site, from 2000-2005. The building is now office space with a private gym where the venue once was. Since 2010, Newcastle upon Tyne has a new venue called "Riverside" on the site of the former Sea night club - this is not connected to the original Riverside venue.

Book
In 2010, Hazel Plater (who worked at the venue) and Carl Taylor (an enthusiastic attendee) began work on a definitive book about the venue, Riverside: Newcastle's Legendary Alternative Music Venue. A preview of the book appeared in the September 2011 edition of The Crack magazine.

References

1985 establishments in England
1999 disestablishments in England
Buildings and structures in Newcastle upon Tyne
Culture in Newcastle upon Tyne
Music venues in Tyne and Wear